Hyposidra infixaria is a geometer moth in the Ennominae subfamily. It is found in Northwestern Himalaya, Southern China, Taiwan and Sundaland, mainly in lowland forests. There is great variation in wing color, presence or absence of the subcostal line.

The larvae has been reared from Psidium guajava (Myrtaceae), Desmos (Annonaceae), Buchanania (Anacardiaceae) and Punica (Punicaceae).

References

External links
The Moths of Borneo

Boarmiini
Ennominae
Moths of Borneo
Moths of Malaysia
Moths of Taiwan
Moths of Asia
Moths described in 1860